Concretism may refer to one of the following
Concrete art, a form of abstractionism
Concrete poetry
Reism, a philosophical movement
Concretism (psychology), a form of thought and feeling that represents concrete concepts related to sensation as opposed to abstractions, see Attitude (psychology)
Reification (fallacy)